Henpecked is a 1930 animated short produced by Walter Lantz that features Oswald the Lucky Rabbit.

Plot
Oswald is playing piano in his apartment room, singing a swing song. Just then, a disturbed bear from another room comes in and confronts him. When the bear opens the door, he sternly drags Oswald off the piano, choking him while his fingers being stuck on keys, and tells Oswald to quit playing and ensure silence. Oswald hesitantly agrees to the demands. A moment later, a frog from a glass bowl jumps out and lands on some piano keys before leaping out of the scene. In this, the bear picks up the piano and tosses it out the window. Before the bruin leaves, Oswald is given a reminder.

Hours later, Oswald receives a phone call. Speaking to him is a stray kitten who is a friend of his. The kitten is looking to come visit Oswald as well as bring in a pack of other stray kittens. Oswald rejects the offer because of the deal he made with his grumpy neighbor. Nevertheless, the stray kittens marched and jumped with joy (the movement of the jumping animation is mixed between 2 different frames of the jump, and a frame of the marching) on sidewalks and roads as one of the kittens in Walter Lantz's voice told the other strays to follow him.

To Oswald's dismay, They jumped with joy and marched inside and begin rough-housing. They jump on beds while yelling "whoopie" (as they later broke the bed making bed bugs, gibberish in chipmunk voices scrambled out of the bed), perform acrobatics on chandeliers, catapult Oswald around with a blanket, and even one of the kittens opened Oswald's mouth by using his ears and another one puts an umbrella inside his mouth, making him acting like a balloon in the hallway. The umbrella was later hooked, and drags Oswald down to the ground making the umbrella come out of his mouth. As they are having their wild fun, one of them decides to play a prank on the bear by putting a clothes iron in the latter's trousers. Oswald tries to intervene but to no avail. The bear twitches in pain and frantically runs around before sitting in a bucket filled with water.

Minutes afterward, one of the stray kittens plays a trombone. As the tiny cat performs, the slide of his instrument starts striking the ceiling, and its impact is felt by the bear who is bathing straight upstairs. Eventually, the floor of the bathroom crumbles and collapses. The bruin plummets to the floor below and figures this is the last straw.

Learning that they are in hot water, Oswald and the stray kittens lock themselves in an apartment room. Immediately, the bear comes up with a successful method of sucking them all including a mouse waiter who is holding some food with a cover on a plate, and Oswald (acting like Oswald's tongue goes through his body) under the door using a vacuum cleaner. The bear removes the vacuum bag and dumps it outside where it opens automatically somehow. Although they are excluded, the stray kittens have had a good time and Oswald cannot believe it. And when the stray cats saw Oswald feeling dazed (moving his head all around in a circle), the stray cats sang Oswald's short theme and pointed to Oswald.

Cast
 Pinto Colvig as Oswald the Lucky Rabbit and the Bear
 Walter Lantz as the stray kittens

Publicity flaws
The second edition of Jeff Lenburg's Encyclopedia of Animated Cartoons mistakenly mentions Hen Fruit as the working title for this short. Hen Fruit is in fact, a 1929 Oswald cartoon. As a result, references to Henpecked were removed in the third edition.

See also
 Oswald the Lucky Rabbit filmography

References

External links
 Henpecked at the Big Cartoon Database
 

1930 films
1930 animated films
1930s American animated films
1930s animated short films
American black-and-white films
Films directed by Walter Lantz
Oswald the Lucky Rabbit cartoons
Universal Pictures animated short films
Walter Lantz Productions shorts
Animated films about bears
Animated films about cats